9Z or 9-Z may refer to:

(9Z)-octadecenoic acid; see Oleic acid
Salmson 9 Z, a model of Salmson 9 aircraft
Clerget 9Z, a model of Clerget-Blin aircraft engine

See also
Z9 (disambiguation)